Trazegnies Castle is a castle located in Trazegnies, Courcelles in the Belgian province of Hainaut.

History
Trazegnies was originally a powerful independent seigneurie on the edges of the Duchy of Brabant, the County of Hainaut and the Prince-Bishopric of Liège and was ruled by a separate dynasty. The original castle was built by Gilles I in the 11th century but was almost completely destroyed in 1554 by the armies of Henry II of France during the Italian War of 1551–1559. Subsequently rebuilt, a corps de logis was added to the castle by Gillion-Othon de Trazegnies in the Louis XIII style in the 17th century. 

The extinction of the Trazegnies dynasty led to the sale of the castle to a coal mine which partitioned off its land, leaving the castle itself to the Belgian state. It had become derelict by 1926 and suffered severe damage from subsidence as a result of underground mining. However, a civic association called the "Friends of Trazegnies Castle" (Les Amis du Château de Trazegnies) successfully opposed its destruction and began a gradual programme of restoration with the support of the Walloon Region. The castle is currently open to the public on designated days.

See also
 List of castles in Belgium
 Marquess of Trazegnies d'Ittre

External links

Trazegnies Castle website

Castles in Belgium